Jane Ryan may refer to:

 Imelda Marcos, who uses a pseudonym "Jane Ryan"
 Jane Ryan Elementary School, a school in Trumbull, Connecticut

See also
 Ryan (disambiguation)
 Jane (disambiguation)